The French Open, also known as Roland-Garros,  is a major tennis tournament held over two weeks at the Stade Roland Garros in Paris, France, beginning in late May each year. The tournament and venue are named after the French aviator Roland Garros. The French Open is the premier clay court championship in the world and the only Grand Slam tournament currently held on this surface. It is chronologically the second of the four annual Grand Slam tournaments, occurring after the Australian Open and before Wimbledon and the US Open. Until 1975, the French Open was the only major tournament not played on grass. Between the seven rounds needed for a championship, the clay surface characteristics (slower pace, higher bounce), and the best-of-five-set men's singles matches, the French Open is widely regarded as the most physically demanding tennis tournament in the world.

History 

Officially named in French les Internationaux de France de Tennis (the "French Internationals of Tennis" in English), the tournament itself uses the name Roland-Garros in all languages, and it is usually called the French Open in English. (The stadium and tournament are both hyphenated as Roland-Garros because French spelling rules dictate that in the name of a place or event named after a person, the elements of the name are joined with a hyphen.)

In 1891 the Championnat de France, which is commonly referred to in English as the French Championships, began. This was only open to tennis players who were members of French clubs. The first winner was H. Briggs, a Briton who resided in Paris and was a member of the Club Stade Français. In the final he defeated P. Baigneres in straight sets. The first women's singles tournament, with four entries, was held in 1897. The mixed doubles event was added in 1902 and the women's doubles in 1907. In the period of 1915–1919, no tournament was organized due to World War I. This tournament was played until 1924, using four venues:

 Societé de Sport de l'Île de Puteaux, in Puteaux, Île-de-France (next to the Seine river); played on the club's ten sand grounds laid out on a bed of rubble. 1891, 1893, 1894 (men's singles), 1895 (men's singles), 1897 (women's singles), 1902 (women's singles and mixed doubles), 1905 (women's singles and mixed doubles), 1907 (men's singles, women's singles, mixed doubles) editions.
 The Croix-Catelan of the Racing Club de France (club founded in 1882 which initially had two lawn-tennis courts with four more grass (pelouse) courts opened some years later, but due to the difficulty of maintenance, they were eventually transformed into clay courts) in the Bois de Boulogne, Paris. 1892, 1894 (men's doubles), 1895 (men's doubles), 1897 (women's singles), 1901 (men's doubles), 1903 (men's doubles and mixed doubles), 1904, 1907 (men's doubles), 1908, 1910–1914, 1920–1924 editions.
 Tennis Club de Paris (club founded in 1895 which initially had four indoor wood courts and five outdoor clay courts), at 71, Boulevard Exelmans in the Auteuil neighborhood, Paris. 1896, 1897 (men's singles), 1898, 1899, 1900, 1901 (men's and women's singles), 1902 (men's singles), 1903 (men's singles and women's singles), 1905 (men's singles) and 1906 editions.
 Société Athlétique de la Villa Primrose in Bordeaux, on clay. Only played in 1909.

In 1925, the French Championships became open to all amateurs internationally and was designated a major championship by the International Lawn Tennis Federation. It was held at the Stade Français in Saint-Cloud (site of the previous World Hard Court Championships) in 1925 and 1927, on clay courts. In 1926 the Croix-Catelan of the Racing Club de France hosted the event in Paris, site of the previous French club members only tournament, also on clay.

Another clay court tournament, called the World Hard Court Championships, is sometimes considered the true precursor to the modern French Open as it admitted international competitors. This was held at Stade Français in Saint-Cloud, from 1912 to 1914, 1920, 1921 and 1923, with the 1922 event held in Brussels, Belgium. Winners of this tournament included world No. 1s such as Tony Wilding from New Zealand (1913, 1914) and Bill Tilden from the US (1921). In 1924 there was no World Hard Court Championships due to tennis being played at the Paris Olympic Games.

After the Mousquetaires or Philadelphia Four (René Lacoste, Jean Borotra, Henri Cochet, and Jacques Brugnon) won the Davis Cup on American soil in 1927, the French decided to defend the cup in 1928 at a new tennis stadium at Porte d'Auteuil. The Stade de France had offered the tennis authorities three hectares of land with the condition that the new stadium must be named after the World War I aviator hero Roland Garros. The new Stade de Roland Garros (whose central court was renamed Court Philippe Chatrier in 1988) hosted that Davis Cup challenge. On May 24, 1928, the French International Championships moved there, and the event has been held there ever since.

During World War II, the Tournoi de France was not held in 1940 and from 1941 through 1945 it took place on the same grounds, but those events are not recognized by the French governing body, the Fédération Française de Tennis. In 1946 and 1947, the French Championships were held after Wimbledon, making it the third Grand Slam event of the year. In 1968, the year of the French General Strike, the French Championships became the first Grand Slam tournament to go open, allowing both amateurs and professionals to compete.

Since 1981, new prizes have been presented: the Prix Orange (for the player demonstrating the best sportsmanship and cooperative attitude with the press), the Prix Citron (for the player with the strongest character and personality) and the Prix Bourgeon (for the tennis player revelation of the year). In another novelty, since 2006 the tournament has begun on a Sunday, featuring 12 singles matches played on the three main courts. Additionally, on the eve of the tournament's opening, the traditional Benny Berthet exhibition day takes place, where the profits go to different charity associations. In March 2007, it was announced that the event would provide equal prize money for both men and women in all rounds for the first time.
In 2010, it was announced that the tournament was considering a move away from Roland Garros as part of a continuing rejuvenation. Plans to renovate and expand Roland Garros have put aside any such consideration, and the tournament remains in its long time home.

2022 finally saw a new tiebreaker format. If the deciding set is tied at six-all, the match is decided in a 10-point format. Should the tiebreaker game be tied at 9-all, whoever scores two straight points wins.

Expansion in the early 3rd millennium 

From 2004 to 2008, plans were developed to build a covered stadium with a roof, as complaints continued over delayed matches. Various proposals were put forward to expand the facility or to move the tournament to a completely new, 55-court venue outside of Paris city limits. In 2011 the decision was taken to maintain the tournament within its existing venue. The expansion project called for a new stadium to be built alongside the historical Auteuil's greenhouses and expansion of old stadiums and the tournament village. A wide-ranging project to overhaul the venue was presented in 2011, including building a roof over Court Philippe-Chatrier, demolishing and replacing Court No. 1 with a grassy hill for outdoors viewing, and geographical extension of the venue eastward into the Jardin des Serres d'Auteuil.

Legal opposition from environmental defence associations and other stakeholders delayed the works for several years as litigation ensued. In particular, the city council voted in May 2015 against the expansion project, but on 9 June 2015 Paris Mayor Anne Hidalgo announced the signing of the construction permits, with work scheduled to begin in September of that year and conclude in 2019. In December 2015, the Administrative Court of Paris once again halted renovation work, but the French Tennis Federation won the right to proceed with the renovation on appeal.

Renovation work finally commenced at the close of the 2018 edition of the tournament. Redeveloped seating and a retractable roof was constructed for Court Philippe-Chatrier and the new 5,000-seat Court Simonne-Mathieu was opened, having been named after France's second-highest achieving female tennis player, and noted for its innovative use of greenhouse encasing architecture. The renewal of the venue has been generally well received by the players and the public. The 2020 edition of the tournament, which was the first to be assisted by the roof over Philippe-Chatrier, was postponed to late September and early October and was played in front of limited spectators, due to the COVID-19 pandemic. Floodlights were also installed over each of the courts in the precinct, allowing the tournament to facilitate night matches for the first time. In 2021, the tournament was back in the traditional slot of late May and early June.

Surface characteristics 

The French Open has been the only major played on clay courts since 1978, when the US Open changed to hard courts. Clay courts slow down the ball and produce a high bounce when compared with grass courts or hard courts. For this reason, clay courts take away some of the advantages of big servers and serve-and-volleyers, which makes it hard for these types of players to dominate on the surface. For example, Pete Sampras, known for his huge serve and who won 14 Grand Slam titles, never won the French Open – his best result was reaching the semi-finals in 1996. Many other notable players have won multiple Grand Slam events but have never won the French Open, including John McEnroe, Frank Sedgman, John Newcombe, Venus Williams, Stefan Edberg, Boris Becker, Lleyton Hewitt, Jimmy Connors, Louise Brough, Virginia Wade or Martina Hingis; McEnroe and Edberg lost their only French Open finals appearances in five sets.

On the other hand, players whose games are more suited to jumpier surfaces, such as Rafael Nadal, Björn Borg, Ivan Lendl, Mats Wilander, Justine Henin and Chris Evert, have found great success at this tournament. In the Open Era, the only male players who have won both the French Open and Wimbledon, played on faster grass courts, are Rod Laver, Jan Kodeš, Björn Borg, Andre Agassi, Rafael Nadal, Roger Federer and Novak Djokovic. Borg's French Open—Wimbledon double was achieved three times consecutively.

Composition of the courts
1. Red brick dust.
2. Crushed white limestone.
3. Clinker (coal residue).
4. Crushed gravel.
5. Drain rock.

Trophies

The trophies have been awarded to the winners since 1953 and are manufactured by Mellerio dits Meller, a famous Parisian jewelry house. They are all made of pure silver with finely etched decorations on their side. Each new singles winner gets his or her name written on the base of the trophy. Winners receive custom-made pure silver replicas of the trophies they have won. They are usually presented by the President of the French Tennis Federation (FFT).

The trophy awarded to the winner of the men's singles is called the Coupe des Mousquetaires (The Musketeers' Cup). It is named in honor of the "Four Musketeers". The trophy weighs 14 kg, is 40 cm high and 19 cm wide. The current design was created in 1981 by the Mellerio dit Meller. Each winner gets a smaller-size replica and the original remains property of the FFT at all times.

The trophy awarded to the winner of the women's singles is called the Coupe Suzanne Lenglen (Suzanne Lenglen Cup) since 1979. The current cup was awarded for the first time in 1986. It is, with a few details, a replica of a cup offered at the time by the city of Nice to Suzanne Lenglen. This trophy, donated by Suzanne Lenglen's family to the Musée National du Sport, was awarded between 1979 and 1985 to every winner until the FFT made a copy. Each winner receives a smaller-size replica and the original remains property of the FFT at all times.

Rankings points and prize money 
When a player makes it to the indicated round, they receive the points and money listed (provided they don't make it to a further round).

Point distribution
Men and women often receive point values based on the rules of their respective tours.

Senior points

Wheelchair points

Junior points

Prize money
For 2022, the prize money pool was announced to be €43.6 million, an increase of 26.87% compared to the prize pool for 2021 edition.

1 Prize money for doubles is per team.

Champions

Former champions 
 Men's singles, winners of the Coupe des Mousquetaires.
 Women's singles, winners of the Coupe Suzanne Lenglen.
 Men's doubles, winners of the Coupe Jacques Brugnon.
 Women's doubles, winners of the Coupe Simone Mathieu.
 Mixed doubles, winners of the Coupe Marcel Bernard.
 All champions

Current champions

Most recent finals

Records 

 French Championships (1891–1924) was only open to French clubs' members. In 1925, it opened to international players, and was later renamed the French Open in 1968, when it allowed professionals to compete with amateurs. See WHCC.

Broadcasting and streaming

France
France Télévisions and Amazon Prime Video hold the broadcast rights to the French Open until 2023.

United Kingdom

BBC began broadcasting French Open finals annually in 1981 (often in their Grandstand or Sunday Grandstand programmes). The BBC's coverage continued until 2011. From 2012 until 2021, ITV Sport televised the French Open in United Kingdom. Eurosport began broadcasting the French open in 1989. As of 2022 onwards, Eurosport hold exclusive UK broadcast rights to the tournament. Studio presentation for the French Open on Eurosport is hosted by Barbara Schett with Mats Wilander. Commentators include Simon Reed, Chris Bradnam, Nick Lester, Barry Millns alongside Jo Durie, Annabel Croft, Frew McMillan, Miles Maclagan, Arvind Parmar and Chris Wilkinson.

India 

In India, Star Sports had the exclusive broadcast rights of the French Open tennis tournament. However, Sony Pictures Sports Network owned by Sony Pictures Networks India has bagged the broadcast rights from 2022 onwards.

United States
NBC's coverage of the French Open began in 1975. Tennis Channel owns pay television rights to the tournament. Coverage of morning window (U.S. time) matches were sub-licensed to ESPN for broadcast by ESPN2 from 2007 through 2015. In August 2015, ESPN announced that it would discontinue its sub-licensing and drop coverage of the French Open beginning in 2016, with network staff citing that because of the structure of the arrangement, its coverage "did not fit our successful model at the other three Majors"—where ESPN is the exclusive rightsholder. Tennis Channel chose to retain these rights under its new owner Sinclair Broadcast Group, nearly doubling the amount of coverage Tennis Channel will air from Roland Garros.

Other than a three-year stint on CBS, NBC has remained the American television network home of the French Open since 1983. Since acquiring rights to the Indianapolis 500 in 2019, NBC's coverage begins on Memorial Day, the second day of the tournament; the network provides coverage windows on the holiday and the second weekend in the afternoon U.S. time. These windows consist of exclusive tape-delayed matches from earlier in the day, but any ongoing matches at the window's start are shown live to their conclusion. The later men's and women's semifinals are broadcast live on NBC in the Eastern Time Zone and tape-delayed in others, but since 2017 these matches are also simulcast on NBCSN to allow nationwide live coverage. Finals are live nationwide.

Ball boys and ball girls 
At the 2022 French Open, there were 280 "ramasseurs de balles" (literally "gatherers of balls" in English), aged between 12 and 16 years old, and dressed in matching shirts and shorts. The ball boys and ball girls are chosen to take part in the French Open through an application process, which in 2022 had approximately 4,000 applicants from across France. Upon selection they are trained in the weeks leading up to the French Open.

See also 
 Lists of champions
 List of French Open champions (all events)
 List of French Open men's singles champions
 List of French Open women's singles champions
 List of French Open men's doubles champions
 List of French Open women's doubles champions
 List of French Open mixed doubles champions
 List of French Open singles finalists during the Open Era, records and statistics

 Other Grand Slam tournaments
 Australian Open
 Wimbledon
 US Open

Notes

References

External links 

 
  Roland Garros on France2
  Roland Garros on ina.fr : more than 600 hours of audio/visual archives
 Photos of Roland Garros
 French Open – All winners and runners-up. Reference book

 
1891 establishments in France
Annual sporting events in France
16th arrondissement of Paris
Grand Slam (tennis) tournaments
Major tennis tournaments
Clay court tennis tournaments
Recurring sporting events established in 1891
June sporting events
May sporting events
Tennis in Paris
Tennis tournaments in France